Sinsa-dong is a ward of Gangnam-gu in Seoul, South Korea. This district contains many department stores, hairshops, churches, boutiques, cafes and restaurants.

Transportation 
The area is served by Sinsa station on the Seoul Subway Line 3, and Seoul buses.

Education
In Shinsa-dong, there are three schools: Singu Primary school (From Grade 1 to Grade 6), Sinsa Junior High school (From Grade 7 to Grade 9) and Hyundai Senior High school (Grade 10 to Grade 12). Sinsa Junior High school and Hyundai Senior High school are located just next to each other.

Visitor attractions
Shingsa-dong Garosugil or Shinsa-dong street tree road is a famous place in Sinsa-dong. There are abundant ginkgo trees on each side of the road. People call this road as “the road of artists” since it has a congenial atmosphere that is made of charming cafes and restaurants. In addition, many Korean celebrities visit this place as they can easily find unique or exotic clothing.

Hangang Park, between Hannam Bridge and Banpo Bridge, has sports facilities such as basketball court, tennis court and swimming pool. In addition, people can find a luxurious ferry boat restaurant in Hangang park.

See also 
Dong of Gangnam-gu

References

External links 
  Official site

Neighbourhoods in Gangnam District